Voice Male is a six-man contemporary a cappella group based in Utah. The group performs covers of contemporary popular songs as well as traditional Latter-day Saint music and some original material. Voice Male formed at Utah State University in 1994 as a nine-man group. Over the next two years several members of the group left, and auditions were held for replacements.  A short time later two more members left, leaving the group with six members.  Voice Male decided at that time to keep the group at six and they remained unchanged until 2010, when Phil Kesler died from cancer.  Rick Murdock was officially added as a new member in 2011.  Voice Male was the winner of the holiday album category in the 1999 Contemporary A Cappella Society for "Jingles", was runner up in the 2001 awards in the cover/pop song category for "Light in Your Eyes" from Hooked, was runner up in the 2006 awards in the holiday album category for Jingles 2, as well as the holiday song category for o come, o come Emmanuel.

Members 
 John Luthy, vocal percussion/bass
 Mike Willson, bass
 John Huff, baritone (John passed away in January 2021 in a skiing accident.)
 Rick Murdock, baritone
 Mike Bearden, tenor
 Richard McAllister, countertenor

Phil Kesler, baritone, was part of this group before his death on February 11, 2010 after a 3-year battle with cancer.

Discography 
At the Tone..., 1995
Voice Male, 1996
up, up, and away..., 1997
HIMS, 1997
Jingles, 1998
Hooked, 2000
Six, 2001
HIMS II, 2003
Jingles 2, 2005
Kids Stuff, 2008
Christmas Live, 2010
Jingles 3, 2012

Awards 
 Contemporary A Cappella Recording Awards (CARAs):
 1999: Best Holiday Album: "Jingles"
 2001: Best Pop/Rock Cover Song Runner-up: "Light in Your Eyes" from "Hooked"
 2006: Best Holiday Album Runner-up: "Jingles 2"
 2006: Best Holiday Song Runner-up: "o come, o come Emmanuel" from "Jingles 2"

References

External links
 Voice Male web site

 
 

A cappella musical groups
American Latter Day Saints
Musical groups from Utah
Musical groups established in 1994
1994 establishments in Utah